Mark Gross (born February 20, 1966)  is a Baltimore-born jazz alto saxophonist of the hard bop tradition. He studied at the Berklee College of Music, graduating in 1988, then worked in the band of Lionel Hampton and performed in Five Guys Named Moe on Broadway. He has since worked with a variety of other artists, including the bands of Delfeayo Marsalis, Nat Adderley and the Dave Holland Big Band. 
Gross first recorded as a solo act with 1997's Preach Daddy, followed in 2000 by The Riddle of the Sphinx, in 2013 with "Blackside", recently Mark Gross + Strings (2018).

Career
Two-time Grammy award winner with the Dave Holland Big Band, Gross has recorded on over 40 jazz recordings, including Grammy-winning projects by the Dave Holland Big Band - 'What Goes Around' on ECM Records, and 'Overtime' on Dare 2 Records.

Gross has released four albums under his own name including Preach Daddy on King Records, Riddle of the Sphinx on J Curve Records, Blackside on Jazz Legacy Productions (JLP), and + Strings on MGQ Records.

Gross has toured the world with the Mark Gross Quartet, Buster Williams, Philip Harper, Nat Adderley, Dave Holland, Mulgrew Miller, Nicholas Payton, Delfeayo Marsalis, Wynton Marsalis, Dizzy Gillespie, Nancy Wilson, Jimmy Heath, Dizzy Gillespie Alumni Big Band, Village Vanguard Jazz Orchestra, Tom Harrell Big Band, Duke Ellington Orchestra, Frank Foster and the Loud Minority, Charles Mingus Big Band, Freddie Hubbard, Donald Harrison, Mark Whitfield, Joe Dukes, Captain Jack McDuff, Joe Chambers, Neal Smith, Cyrus Chestnut, Regina Carter, Lionel Hampton, Stephon Harris, Walter Booker, Jimmy Cobb, Don Braden, Vincent Gardner, Lenora Zenzalai Helm, Marlon Saunders, SEPIA and Jann Parker among others.

Gross has performed on Broadway several times, including Five Guys Named Moe (1992-1993) based on the music of Louis Jordan, and Kat and the Kings (1999-2000), based on music born out of oppression during the 1950s in Cape Town, South Africa; as well as 'Swing!' (2000-2001). After Midnight
The Broadway production began previews at the Brooks Atkinson Theatre on October 18, 2013 and opened on November 3, 2013 with special guest star Fantasia Barrino, who performed through February 9, 2014. The production features Dule Hill as "The Host", Adriane Lenox, Karine Plantadit and Desmond Richardson.[4][5] Direction and choreography is by Warren Carlyle, with Scenic Design by John Lee Beatty, costumes by Isabel Toledo, lighting by Howell Binkley, and sound by Peter Hylenski. Shuffle Along, Shuffle Along, or, the Making of the Musical Sensation of 1921 and All That Followed is a musical with a score by Eubie Blake and Noble Sissle and a libretto by George C. Wolfe, based on the original book of the 1921 musical revue Shuffle Along, by Flournoy Miller and Aubrey Lyles. The story focuses on the challenges of mounting the original production of Shuffle Along and its effect on Broadway and race relations. Ain't Too Proud: the Life and Times of the Temptations, Ain’t Too Proud: The Life and Times of The Temptations is a 2018 jukebox musical with music and lyrics by The Temptations and a book by Dominique Morisseau. Based on the story of The Temptations, the musical had a series of regional productions and opened at Broadway’s Imperial Theatre in March 2019. Currently playing at the Imperial Theater.

Early life
Gross credits his sound to the appreciation for gospel music that resounded through his parents' Baltimore home. Gross' father was pastor of his hometown church Mt. Zion C.O.G.I.C. up until his death February 1, 2007. After developing his interests in classical music at the Baltimore School for the Arts, Gross studied one semester at Howard University and four years at Berklee College of Music. He earned a Bachelor of Arts Degree in Music Performance at Berklee College of Music, where he studied under professors Joe Viola and Bill Pierce. Upon graduation in 1988, Gross began his professional music career in Jazz.

References

External links 
Mark Gross website
Jazz Reach.org
Encyclopedia of Jazz Musicians entry for Mark Gross 

1966 births
American jazz alto saxophonists
American male saxophonists
Berklee College of Music alumni
Living people
Musicians from Baltimore
21st-century American saxophonists
Jazz musicians from Maryland
21st-century American male musicians
American male jazz musicians